Jean-Philippe is a 2006 French film co-written and directed by Laurent Tuel and starring Fabrice Luchini, alongside Johnny Hallyday as a fictional version of himself.

Premise 
After an accident, Fabrice, a fan of Johnny Hallyday, falls into a coma and wakes up in a parallel world in which Johnny (using his birth name Jean-Philippe Smet), had abandoned his singing career and never became a star. He convinces Jean-Philippe to become the rock star he should have been.

Cast 
 Fabrice Luchini as Fabrice
 Johnny Hallyday as himself
 Guilaine Londez as Babette
 Antoine Duléry as Chris Summer
 Élodie Bollée as Laura/Marion
 Olivier Guéritée as Laurent
 Caroline Cellier as Caroline
 Sophie Cattani as Jennifer
 Benoît Poelvoorde as Bernard Frédéric, a Claude François impersonator
 Jackie Berroyer as the professor
 Jeanne Herry as the bride
 Lise Lamétrie as the walking girl
 Jacky Nercessian

References

External links

Jean-Philippe at the CBO 

Jean-Philippe
Alternate timeline films
2000s French films